Lebanon South is an unincorporated area and census-designated place (CDP) in Lebanon County, Pennsylvania, United States. The population was 2,270 at the 2010 census.

Geography
Lebanon South is located in central Lebanon County at  (40.329614, -76.410835), in the northwest corner of South Lebanon Township. It is bordered to the north and west by the city of Lebanon, the county seat.

The community is drained by northwest-flowing tributaries of Quittapahilla Creek, part of the Swatara Creek watershed flowing to the Susquehanna River.

Demographics

As of the census of 2000, there were 2,145 people, 947 households, and 661 families residing in the CDP. The population density was 2,711.6 people per square mile (1,048.3/km). There were 974 housing units at an average density of 1,231.3/sq mi (476.0/km). The racial makeup of the CDP was 97.39% White, 0.61% African American, 0.05% Native American, 0.89% Asian, 0.51% from other races, and 0.56% from two or more races. Hispanic or Latino of any race were 1.77% of the population.

There were 947 households, out of which 23.7% had children under the age of 18 living with them, 59.8% were married couples living together, 7.4% had a female householder with no husband present, and 30.2% were non-families. 25.7% of all households were made up of individuals, and 15.3% had someone living alone who was 65 years of age or older. The average household size was 2.26 and the average family size was 2.70.

In the CDP, the population was spread out, with 18.6% under the age of 18, 4.5% from 18 to 24, 26.2% from 25 to 44, 24.2% from 45 to 64, and 26.5% who were 65 years of age or older. The median age was 45 years. For every 100 females, there were 86.8 males. For every 100 females age 18 and over, there were 82.7 males.

The median income for a household in the CDP was $46,366, and the median income for a family was $52,813. Males had a median income of $39,500 versus $23,409 for females. The per capita income for the CDP was $23,358. About 2.8% of families and 3.8% of the population were below the poverty line, including 7.1% of those under age 18 and 3.3% of those age 65 or over.

References

Census-designated places in Lebanon County, Pennsylvania
Census-designated places in Pennsylvania